Plagiotremus ewaensis, the Ewa blenny, Ewa fangblenny or the blue-stripe blenny, is a species of combtooth blenny found in coral reefs in the eastern central Pacific Ocean also found in Hawai'i.  This species reaches a length of  SL.

References

ewaensis
Fish described in 1948